Mary Blagg Huey (January 19, 1922 – June 27, 2017) was an American educator. She served as president of Texas Woman's University from 1976-1986.

She was born Mary Evelyn Blagg in Wills Point and was educated at North Texas High School, going on to earn a bachelor's degree in English and music and a master's degree in English literature from Texas State College for Women, a master's degree in public administration from the University of Kentucky and a PhD in political science from Duke University.

From 1943-45, she taught English at the Texas State College for Women. She was assistant director of the Bureau of Public Administration at the University of Mississippi from 1946-47. From 1947-71, she was a member of the faculty of government at North Texas State University and, from 1971–76, was dean of the graduate school at Texas Woman's University.

Life and legacy
She married Griffin B. Huey, a dentist; the couple had one son. She died on June 27, 2017, at the age of 95.

In 1984, she was inducted into the Texas Women's Hall of Fame. Huey also received the Secretary of Defense Medal for Outstanding Public Service, the Otis Fowler Citizen of the Year Award and the Outstanding Women of Texas Award from the Texas division of the American Association of University Women.

References

1922 births
2017 deaths
People from Wills Point, Texas
Texas Woman's University alumni
University of Kentucky alumni
Duke University alumni
Texas Woman's University faculty
Heads of universities and colleges in the United States
Kentucky women in education
Women heads of universities and colleges
American women academics
21st-century American women